VA-155 was an Attack Squadron of the U.S. Navy. It was established as Torpedo Squadron VT-153 on 26 March 1945. The squadron was redesignated as VA-16A on 15 November 1946, and finally designated as VA-155 on 15 July 1948. It was disestablished on 30 November 1949. Its nickname is unknown. It was the first squadron to be named VA-155, the second VA-155 was originally established in 1946, redesignated as VA-155 on 4 February 1953, and disestablished on 30 September 1977, while a third VA-155 was established on 1 September 1987 and disestablished on 30 April 1993.

During the squadron’s deployment to the western Pacific from March to October 1947, three of its aircraft were equipped as antisubmarine warfare (ASW) planes, giving it an ASW mission as well as attack.

Home port assignments
The squadron was assigned to these home ports, effective on the dates shown:
 NAAF Lewiston – 26 Mar 1945
 NAAS Oceana – 01 Jun 1945
 NAS Norfolk – 02 Jul 1946
 NAS Alameda – 08 Aug 1946
 NAS Whidbey Island - O1 Sep 1987

Aircraft assignment
The squadron first received the following aircraft on the dates shown:
 TBM-3E Avenger – 30 Mar 1945
 TBM-3Q Avenger – Apr 1946
 TBM-3W Avenger – Apr 1947
 AD-2 Skyraider – 19 Jul 1948
 A-6E Intruder - 01 Sep 1987

See also
 List of squadrons in the Dictionary of American Naval Aviation Squadrons
 Attack aircraft
 List of inactive United States Navy aircraft squadrons
 History of the United States Navy

References

External links

Attack squadrons of the United States Navy
Wikipedia articles incorporating text from the Dictionary of American Naval Aviation Squadrons